Red Hood/Arsenal is a 2015 comic book series published by DC Comics featuring the characters Red Hood (Jason Todd) and Arsenal (Roy Harper). It was written by Scott Lobdell and illustrated by Dexter Soy and Denis Medri. The series was the second ongoing title for the character Jason Todd.

Publication history
The series was a continuation of Lobdell's earlier series Red Hood and the Outlaws. Lobdell enjoyed working with artist Dexter Soy and he was brought on for the main series. The new series Red Hood/Arsenal focuses on the two characters being "heroes for hire" with new costumes. The series heavily featured the character Joker's Daughter. It partook in the "Robin War" storyline in 2016. The series was concluded that same year to coincide with DC Rebirth.

Reception
The series holds an average rating of 5.9 by 63 professional critics on review aggregation website Comic Book Roundup.

Collected editions

See also
 List of Batman comics
 List of DC Comics publications
 Red Hood
 Arsenal (DC Comics)

References

External links
 Red Hood/Arsenal art at Denis Medri's website

Red Hood titles
2015 comics debuts
2016 comics endings